Eastern Township may refer to one of the following townships in the United States:

 Eastern Township, Franklin County, Illinois
 Eastern Township, Otter Tail County, Minnesota
 Eastern Township, Knox County, Nebraska

See also 
 Eastern Townships, a tourist region and former administrative division of Quebec, Canada

Township name disambiguation pages